Minute To Win It is a Malayalam-language Indian game show which premiered  on Mazhavil Manorama channel and is hosted by RJ Nyla Usha. The show is based on a US television game show on the same title, Minute to Win It. The show already telecast in Tamil, Kannada and English across India. Mazhavil Manorama is the first Malayalam-language channel to adopt the International television show to its channel. This game show had succeeded in more than 60 countries.

Format 
In the game show, the contestant is needed to complete a certain level with 60-seconds time period and need to complete each and every levels to reach the Top of Money Tree with Three Lives.

Celebrity contestants

Thatteem Mutteem team
Sanusha & Sanoop Santhosh
Kavi Uddheshichathu..? team
Malavika Wales & Rahul Ravi
D 4 Dance team

Awards
Best Anchor - Nyla Usha at FLOWERS TV AWARDS 2017

References 

Minute to Win It
2016 Indian television series debuts
Malayalam-language television shows
Indian game shows
Indian reality television series
Indian television series based on American television series
Mazhavil Manorama original programming